Shelley M. Day (born April 16, 1957) is a former producer of video games. She began her career in 1985, at Electronic Arts. Day also worked for Accolade, Taito and LucasArts before founding Humongous Entertainment together with colleague Ron Gilbert. She was the producer on Grand Prix Circuit and The Duel: Test Drive II at Accolade, and Monkey Island 2: LeChuck's Revenge and Indiana Jones and the Fate of Atlantis at Lucasarts. She created the Putt-Putt series' eponymous protagonist as a bedtime story for her son, which later became a popular series of children's video games. In 1999 she was listed on Time Magazine as one of the "Cyber Elite". After leaving Humongous Entertainment in 2001, Day and Gilbert founded Hulabee Entertainment to provide online games for kids, with approximately 20 former Humongous Entertainment staff joining them.

Fraud conviction
She was convicted of falsely claiming to the bank loan officer that Disney Interactive had agreed to buy part of Hulabee Entertainment and presenting forged documents to support that claim.

References

External links 
Shelley M. Day at MobyGames

1957 births
American female criminals
American people convicted of fraud
American video game designers
American video game producers
Electronic Arts employees
Living people
Lucasfilm people
Place of birth missing (living people)
Women video game designers